This is a list of universities and colleges in Shanghai.

Others 
 People's Liberation Army Naval Medical University (中国人民解放军海军军医大学)
 China Executive Leadership Academy in Pudong (中国浦东干部学院)
 China Europe International Business School (CEIBS) (中欧国际工商学院)
 East-Sea University (上海东海学院)

References
List of Chinese Higher Education Institutions Official list of universities and colleges from the Ministry of Education
Study in Shanghai Official website for foreign students studying in Shanghai

 
Shanghai
Universities
Shanghai